The  ("Badge for Military Merit"), commonly called the Bukōshō, was a military decoration of the Empire of Japan, established on 7 December 1944 by Imperial edict. It was awarded by the Imperial Japanese Army (IJA) to living soldiers who had performed with exceptional valor in battle. Airmen,  especially fighter pilots defending Japan against enemy bombers, were most likely to win the award. Eighty-nine Bukōshō were awarded during the eight months it was actively awarded.

Background
The Order of the Golden Kite had served for decades as an auspicious military award of the Japanese armed forces, and was the only Japanese order that was solely awarded to the military (the Order of the Rising Sun and the Order of the Sacred Treasure could also be awarded to civilians). However, the process by which Order of the Golden Kite was awarded was very lengthy: it was indeed awarded to military men who had died in service, while the remainder were normally awarded only after the end of a war, for services throughout the conflict. As the Second World War dragged on, it became apparent that there was a need to promote morale among active army units by rewarding acts of valor more readily. To this end, the IJA suggested the Bukōchōshō as an alternate decoration for living recipients who had shown the highest valor in combat, to be awarded much more quickly by division commanders in the field. Emperor Hirohito established the award on 7 December 1944, the third anniversary of the attacks on Hong Kong and Pearl Harbor, which had signaled the start of the broader Pacific War.

Award
The Bukōshō (as it was popularly known) was presented in two classes, called A and B, or First and Second. Loosely resembling the Iron Cross 1st Class, the Bukōshō was a pin back badge, cast in iron or steel, featuring two shields (in gilt for A-Class, bronzed for B-Class) forming a cross, with a gilt banner at the center bearing the two kanji characters "Bukō" (Military Merit). The reverse side (again in gilt for A-Class, bronzed for B-Class) bore the six kanji characters in two columns "Rikugun/Bukōchōshō" (Army/Badge for Military Merit).

The Bukōshō was allowed to be given retroactively to soldiers who had distinguished themselves as far back as 1941 or perhaps 1940. In practice, the award was given disproportionately to fighter pilots flying against the American Boeing B-29 Superfortresses bombing the Japanese homeland. The first three men to win the award were Toru Shinomiya, Masao Itagaki and Matsumi Nakano—pilots flying the Kawasaki Ki-61 Hien fighter known by the Allies as the "Tony". On 3 December 1944, the three men were successful in very risky aerial ramming attacks. Another pilot, Masao Itagaki, successfully rammed B-29s on two occasions to earn two Bukōshō. Unusually, the IJA awarded the Bukōshō to at least one aviator of the Imperial Japanese Navy, for valiant action in the Battle of the Philippine Sea on 19–20 June 1944.

Selected recipients

First or A-class

Tadao Sumi, fighter pilot

Second or B-class

Isamu Kashiide, fighter pilot
Isamu Sasaki, fighter pilot

Unknown class

Toru Shinomiya, fighter pilot
Masao Itagaki, fighter pilot
Matsumi Nakano, fighter pilot
Kuniyoshi Tanaka, fighter pilot
Satohide Kohatsu, fighter pilot
Yoshio Yoshida, fighter pilot
Tohru Shinomiya, fighter pilot
Sadamitsu Kimura, fighter pilot
Shigeyasu Miyamoto, fighter pilot
Kenji Fujimoto, fighter pilot
Teruhiko Kobayashi, fighter pilot
Chuichi Ichikawa, fighter pilot
Takashi Nakai, fighter pilot
Tomojiro Ogawa, fighter pilot
Makoto Ogawa, fighter pilot
Yasushi Miyamotobayashi, fighter pilot
Isamu Hoya, fighter pilot
Yojiro Ohbusa, fighter pilot
Totaro Ito, fighter pilot
Koki Kawamoto, fighter pilot
Mitsuo Oyake, fighter pilot
Naoyuki Ogata, fighter pilot
Sergeant-Major Kobayashi, Battle of Mindanao
First Lieutenant Oki, Battle of Mindanao
Commander Terao Kisaemon, Battle of Mindanao

See also 

 Distinguished Service Cross (United States)
 Knight's Cross of the Iron Cross (Germany)
 Médaille militaire (France)
 Medal "For Courage" (USSR)
 Medal of Military Valor (Italy)
 Order of Loyalty and Valour (Republic of China)
 Silver Star (United States)
 Victoria Cross (United Kingdom & Commonwealth Realms)

References

Military awards and decorations of Japan
Military of the Empire of Japan
1944 establishments in Japan
Awards disestablished in 1945
Awards established in 1944